SMOT School of Business is a business school founded in 2006 in the city of Chennai, India. SMOT offers 18 months Full Time and 24 months Weekend Post Graduate Diploma in Business Administration (PGDBA) in collaboration with Saint Mary's University, Canada and Bharathidasan University, Trichy. 

SMOT is a private and autonomous institution run under the aegis of Golden Academy of Higher Education Pvt. Ltd.

External links
 http://www.smot.edu.in

Business schools in Chennai
Educational institutions established in 2006
2006 establishments in Tamil Nadu